The Ishtar Hotel is a hotel in Baghdad, Iraq located on Firdos Square. At 99 meters tall, it is the tallest building in Baghdad and the tallest structure in Iraq after the Baghdad Tower.

History 
Named after the ancient goddess Ishtar, the hotel opened in 1982 as the Ishtar Sheraton Hotel & Casino (Arabic, فندق شيراتون عشتار). It was one of the most popular western-run hotels in Baghdad. When the Gulf War began in 1991, Sheraton Hotels severed their management contract with the Iraqi government, which built and owned the property. The hotel continued to use the Sheraton name without permission for the following 22 years.

While the hotel was briefly popular with foreign journalists and contractors after the 2003 invasion of Iraq, its occupancy level soon dropped sharply. The hotel, an obvious and imposing target, was periodically hit with mortar or rocket fire during the early years of the post-Saddam era. The structure was seriously damaged during a bomb attack in October 2005 and was closed for more than a year afterward. Thirty-seven were killed in a car bomb attack outside of the hotel on January 25, 2010.

This hotel was renovated in 2011, along with five other of the biggest hotels in Baghdad, in preparation for the 2012 Arab League summit. The renovations were done by a Turkish company. During the Arab League summit, officials from various countries stayed at the hotel, along with journalists. The hotel was renamed Cristal Grand Ishtar Hotel in March 2013.

The lobby features a marble statue of Isthar, standing on a fountain in the shape of the Star of Ishtar and the Star of Shamash.

Gallery

See also
Baghdad Hotel
Palestine Hotel
Al Rasheed Hotel
Basra International Hotel

References

External links

Hotels in Iraq
Buildings and structures in Baghdad
1982 establishments in Iraq
Hotels established in 1982
Hotel buildings completed in 1982